The Royal Queensland Yacht Squadron is a Squadron (not a club which is reflected in its support for all things sailing) in Brisbane, Queensland, Australia.

History 
The Queensland Yacht Squadron was founded in 1885, received royal charter in 1902, and added Royal to its title in 1961. Its members have competed at the Olympic Games since 1956. In 1970 the club made the news for preventing its female sailors from attending a function hosted by the club and attended by Prince Philip, Duke of Edinburgh. In 2006, the club's registration with Yachting Queensland was controversially suspended for a short period after the club failed to forward affiliation fees to the state governing body.

References

External links
Official Website

Yacht clubs in Queensland
Sports clubs established in 1885
1885 establishments in Australia
Queensland Yacht Squadron, Royal